Jerzy Wieteski (16 October 1934 – 24 April 2014) – was a Polish footballer.

He was a youth product of ŁKS Łódź, where he played from 1952 to 1965. In 1957 he won Polish Cup and year later he was crowned a Polish Champion.

References

1934 births
2014 deaths
Polish footballers
ŁKS Łódź players
Place of birth missing
Association football forwards